Edward Knatchbull Hughes D'Aeth (11 September 1866 – 19 September 1923) was an English first-class cricketer.

The son of Narborough Hughes D'Aeth, he was born at Knowlton Court in Kent in September 1866. He was educated at Haileybury, before going up to St Mary Hall, Oxford in 1885, before transferring to Lincoln College, Oxford in April 1886. While studying at Oxford, he three appearances in first-class cricket for Oxford University in 1885, against the Marylebone Cricket Club, Lancashire and the Gentlemen of England. In his three first-class matches for Oxford, D'Aeth scored 44 runs with a high score of 22.

He later migrated to Florida to become a fruit farmer, where he married in 1894 and was living at Tampa in 1899. D'Aeth died at New York City in September 1923. His grandfather, Henry Knight, and brother, Lewis D'Aeth, both played first-class cricket.

References

External links

1866 births
1923 deaths
People from Goodnestone, Dover
People educated at Haileybury and Imperial Service College
Alumni of St Mary Hall, Oxford
Alumni of Lincoln College, Oxford
English cricketers
Oxford University cricketers
English emigrants to the United States
English farmers